The Duke Energy Building (formerly the Cincinnati Gas & Electric Company Building) is a historic, 18-story,  structure in Cincinnati, Ohio. It was designed by Cincinnati architectural firm Garber & Woodward and John Russell Pope.

History 

The neoclassical tower was completed in 1929 for the Cincinnati Gas & Electric Company and served as the company's headquarters until its merger with Duke Energy in 2006. From 1946 to 2011, CG&E sponsored an annual holiday model train display in the building's first-floor lobby.

See also
Duke Energy Convention Center

References

External links
Emporis listing

Office buildings completed in 1929
Duke Energy
Skyscraper office buildings in Cincinnati
1929 establishments in Ohio